Postal Highway also called Hulaki Rajmarg runs across the Terai region of Nepal, from Bhadrapur, Jhapa in the east to Dodhara, Kanchanpur in the west, cutting across the entire width of the country. It is the oldest highway in Nepal constructed by Juddha Shumsher Jung Bahadur Rana & Padma Shumsher Jung Bahadur Rana to aid transportation and facilitate postal services throughout the nation 

The highway is a two lane road which connects 20 districts of terai frontier and 57% of construction of the road has been completed until November 2020.Hulaki rajmarga nirdeshanalaya, department of roads is a government office related to any things on this project.

References

Highways in Nepal
National Pride Projects
1930s establishments in Nepal